Meletus (fl. 5th–4th century BCE) was an ancient Athenian Greek from the Pithus deme known for his prosecuting role in the trial and eventual execution of the philosopher Socrates.

Life
Little is known of Meletus' life beyond what is portrayed in the Socratic literature, particularly Plato's dialogues, where he is named as the chief accuser of Socrates.  In the Euthyphro, Plato describes Meletus as the youngest of the three prosecutors, having "a beak, and long straight hair, and a beard which is ill grown," and being unknown to Socrates prior to the prosecution.  Meletus is also mentioned briefly in the Theaetetus. In Xenophon's Hellenica, he is reported as one of the envoys that were sent to negotiate a truce with the Lacedaemonians during the war between the democratic rebels and the Thirty Tyrants.

The later Greek historian Diogenes Laërtius dubiously reported that after the execution of Socrates "Athenians felt such remorse" that they executed Meletus and banished his associates from the city. He also argues that it was Antisthenes, the disciple of Socrates and founder of Cynicism, who was largely thought responsible for the execution of Meletus.

Trial of Socrates

During the first three hours of trial, Meletus and the other two accusers each stood in the law court in the center of Athens to deliver previously crafted speeches to the jury against Socrates.  No record of Meletus' speech survives.  However, within the Apology we do have Plato's record of Socrates' cross-examination of Meletus, per the Athenian legal convention allowing the defendant to cross-examine the accuser.  Using his characteristic Socratic method, Socrates makes Meletus to seem an inarticulate fool.  He says that Socrates corrupts the young, and that Socrates is the only one to do so, but he can not provide a motive for why Socrates would do this. Socrates shows that if he were to do this it must surely be in ignorance, for no good man would intentionally make bad those living around him.  Concerning the accusation that Socrates believed in strange spirits and not the gods of the state, Socrates shows that Meletus is saying that spirits are the offspring of gods, and since no one believes in flutes playing without flute players, or in horses' offspring without horses, Socrates could not believe in the offspring of gods without believing in gods.

See also
List of speakers in Plato's dialogues

References

Ancient Athenians
Socrates